Dragiša Binić (Serbian Cyrillic: Драгиша Бинић; born 20 October 1961) is a Serbian former footballer who played for Red Star and was part of their European Cup victory in 1991. He had three caps for the Yugoslavia national football team, scoring one goal. His son Vladan Binić is also a footballer.

Club career

Red Star Belgrade
In the summer 1987 transfer window, soon to be twenty-six-year old striker Binić signed with Red Star Belgrade. The move meant reuniting with his former Radnički Niš young teammate Dragan Stojković who had transferred to Red Star a year earlier and already managed to establish himself as the team star and fan favourite. Led by head coach Velibor Vasović, the ambitious Belgrade club was looking to get back on the winning track after a disappointing league season. Other arrivals to the club included the twenty-four-year-old defender Goran Jurić from Velež Mostar, twenty-two-year-old defensive midfielder Refik Šabanadžović from Željezničar Sarajevo, and talented eighteen-year-old creative midfield prospect Robert Prosinečki from Dinamo Zagreb.

With Bora Cvetković and Husref Musemić as his main competition at the forward spots, Binić looked to be settling well into the new environment alongside team regulars: midfielder Žarko Đurović, attacking midfielder Goran Milojević, midfield playmaker and emerging team leader Dragan Stojković, and defenders Slobodan Marović and Miodrag Krivokapić. Following a good start to the season with Binić scoring away at FK Priština, the combustible striker and coach Vasović quickly developed an antagonistic relationship, with Binić getting suspended from the squad over an insubordination quarrel with the coach. After missing several months of match action while only training with the team, Binić got reinstated following another reported incident with Vasović that apparently featured the striker confronting the coach in front of his private residence.

Career statistics

Club

International

International goals
Yugoslavia score listed first, score column indicates score after each Binić goal.''

Honours
Red Star Belgrade
Yugoslav First League: 1987–88, 1990–91
European Champion Clubs' Cup: 1990–91

References

External links
 
 
 Profile on Serbia federation site 
 

1961 births
Living people
Association football forwards
Yugoslav footballers
Yugoslav expatriate footballers
Yugoslavia international footballers
Serbian footballers
Serbian expatriate footballers
Serbia and Montenegro expatriate footballers
Serbia and Montenegro footballers
FK Napredak Kruševac players
FK Radnički Niš players
Red Star Belgrade footballers
Yugoslav First League players
Stade Brestois 29 players
Ligue 2 players
Levante UD footballers
Segunda División players
SK Slavia Prague players
APOEL FC players
Cypriot First Division players
J1 League players
Japan Football League (1992–1998) players
Nagoya Grampus players
Sagan Tosu players
Expatriate footballers in Japan
Expatriate footballers in France
Expatriate footballers in Spain
Expatriate footballers in Cyprus
Sportspeople from Niš
Yugoslav expatriate sportspeople in France
Yugoslav expatriate sportspeople in Spain
Expatriate footballers in Czechoslovakia
Yugoslav expatriate sportspeople in Czechoslovakia
Serbia and Montenegro expatriate sportspeople in Japan
Serbia and Montenegro expatriate sportspeople in Cyprus
Yugoslav expatriate sportspeople in Japan